Acheilognathus nguyenvanhaoi is a species of freshwater ray-finned fish in the genus Acheilognathus.  It is endemic to Vietnam.

Named in honor of Vietnamese ichthyologist Nguyen Van Hao.

References

Acheilognathus
Fish of Vietnam
Endemic fauna of Vietnam
Fish described in 2013